Yordan Luis O'Farrill Olivera (born 9 February 1993 in Santa Cruz del Sur, Camagüey) is a Cuban hurdler.

He won a gold medal in the 110 metres hurdles at the 2012 World Junior Championships in Athletics in Barcelona, while also beating Artur Noga's championship record.

O'Farrill is of Irish descent through his grandfather on his father's side.

Personal bests

Outdoor
100 m: 10.44 s (wind: +1.8 m/s) –  Bilbao, 21 June 2014
110 m hurdles: 13.19 s (wind: 0.0 m/s) –  Prague, 9 June 2014

Indoor
60 m hurdles: 7.65 s –  Düsseldorf, 8 February 2013

International competitions

1: Disqualified in the final.

2: Did not finish in the semifinals

References

External links

Tilastopaja biography

1993 births
Living people
Cuban male hurdlers
Olympic male hurdlers
Olympic athletes of Cuba
Athletes (track and field) at the 2016 Summer Olympics
Athletes (track and field) at the 2010 Summer Youth Olympics
World Athletics Championships athletes for Cuba
Cuban people of Irish descent
Central American and Caribbean Games medalists in athletics
Competitors at the 2014 Central American and Caribbean Games
Central American and Caribbean Games gold medalists for Cuba
People from Santa Cruz del Sur
21st-century Cuban people